New Mind may refer to:
New Mind (band), a band from the UK
New Mind (song), a single by the band Swans